Steven "Steve Tiberius" Gibson (born March 26, 1955) is an American software engineer, security researcher, and IT security proponent. In the early 1980s, he worked on light pen technology for use with Apple and Atari systems, and in 1985, founded Gibson Research Corporation, best known for its SpinRite software.

Early life
Gibson started working on computers as a teenager, and got his first computing job with Stanford University's artificial intelligence lab when he was 15 years old. He then studied electrical engineering and computer science at the University of California, Berkeley.

Career
Gibson was hired as a programmer for California Pacific Computer Company in 1980, where he worked on copy protection for the company's products. He then founded Gibson Laboratories in Laguna Hills, California, in 1981, which developed a light pen for the Apple II, Atari, and other platforms before going out of business in 1983.

In 1985, Gibson founded Gibson Research Corporation (GRC), a computer software development firm, and from 1986 to 1993, he wrote the "Tech Talk" column for InfoWorld magazine.

In 1999, Gibson created one of the first adware removal programs, which he called OptOut. In 2001, he predicted that Microsoft's implementation of the SOCK_RAW protocol in the initial release of Windows XP would lead to widespread chaos by making it easier for Windows XP users to create denial of service (DoS) attacks. That year, his company's website was brought down by DoS attacks which continued for two weeks. Gibson blogged about the attacks and his (ultimately successful) efforts to track down the hacker. Three years after the Windows XP release, Microsoft limited raw socket support in Service Pack 2.

In 2005, he launched a weekly podcast called Security Now with Leo Laporte on TWiT.tv, with its archives hosted on GRC's website.

In 2006, Gibson raised the possibility that the Windows Metafile vulnerability bug was actually a backdoor intentionally engineered into the system. A response by Microsoft, and by Mark Russinovich on Microsoft's Technet blog, stated that the bug appeared to be coding error and that Gibson's reasoning was based upon Microsoft's abort procedure documentation being misleading.

In 2013, he proposed SQRL as a way to simplify the process of authentication without the risk of revelation of information about the transaction to a third party.

GRC products
GRC has created a number of utilities, most of which are freeware.

 DNS Benchmark, freeware that lets users test the performance of the domain name servers used by their internet service providers.
 Securable, freeware to test whether a pre-Windows 7 computer is 64-bit compatible. It also tells the user whether Data Execution Prevention is enabled.
 Shields Up, a free browser-based firewall testing service; one of the oldest available
 SpinRite, a hard disk scanning and data recovery utility first released in 1988.  the current version was 6.0, which was first released in 2004.  SpinRite is a commercial product, costing  .  Gibson's work on SpinRite has led to him being considered an expert on hard drive failure.
 Spoofarino, freeware released in 2006 and promised since the controversy over the launch of Windows XP in 2001, it enables users to test whether their internet service providers allow them to send forged or "spoofed" packets of data to Gibson's Web site.
 Never10, standalone freeware program that toggles registry values in Windows 7, 8, and 8.1, which either disables or enables Microsoft's Get Windows 10 app and automatic OS upgrade. As of version 1.3, it also triggers the removal of any previously downloaded Windows 10 upgrade files as part of the disable function. He has also stated that he is producing "Never11", to stop automatic upgrading to Windows 11.
 InSpectre, a utility that examines a computer's vulnerability to the Meltdown and Spectre attacks.
 InitDisk, a tool that was developed for GRC's next release of SpinRite(6.1). It's a safe USB drive formatter that allows the user to reformat any USB device and make it bootable.
 ReadSpeed, an accurate benchmark for PC mass storage. The tool measures stability and repeatability to a precision of more than 4 significant digits.
 InControl, a tool which allows managing Windows 10 and 11 out-of-control updating and upgrading. It is the successor to Never10.

Works

References

External links

http://www.computerhistory.org/collections/catalog/102674112

1955 births
Living people
American computer programmers
American podcasters
Computer security specialists
Businesspeople from Dayton, Ohio
People from Orange County, California
UC Berkeley College of Engineering alumni
TWiT.tv people
Chief executives in the technology industry
American chief executives
20th-century American businesspeople
Businesspeople from California